Tessmann's flycatcher (Muscicapa tessmanni) is a species of bird in the family Muscicapidae.
It is found in central and western Africa from the Democratic Republic of the Congo to Sierra Leone.
Its natural habitat is subtropical or tropical moist shrubland.

References

Tessmann's flycatcher
Birds of Sub-Saharan Africa
Tessmann's flycatcher
Taxonomy articles created by Polbot
Taxobox binomials not recognized by IUCN